Seppo Sakari Pääkkönen (born 15 June 1957 in Kuhmo) is a Finnish actor.

He is married to Virve Havelin. Their son Jasper Pääkkönen is also an actor.

Pääkkönen played Matti's father in the 2006 film Matti: Hell Is for Heroes, where his real-life son plays his on-screen son.

His younger brother Antti Pääkkönen is also an actor.

Partial filmography 
 Uuno Turhapuro – Suomen tasavallan herra presidentti (1990)
 Santa Claus and the Magic Drum (Joulupukki ja noitarumpu, 1996)
 Cyclomania (2001)
 Pelicanman (Pelikaanimies, 2004)
 Matti: Hell Is for Heroes (Matti, 2006)
 V2: Dead Angel (V2 – Jäätynyt enkeli, 2007)
 Run Sister Run! (Sisko tahtoisin jäädä, 2010)
 Wildeye (Kätilö) (2015)

External links

1957 births
Living people
People from Kuhmo
Finnish male film actors